Stone Classics may refer to:
 Xiping Stone Classics of the Han Dynasty
 Kaicheng Stone Classics of the Tang Dynasty